Christopher James Sharp (born 23 May 1964) is a former English cricketer.  Sharp was a right-handed batsman who bowled right-arm off break.  He was born at Orsett, Essex.

Currently the English ambassador for the Indian tourist board.

Sharp represented the Essex Cricket Board in a single List A match against Ireland in the 1999 NatWest Trophy.  In his only List A match he scored 13 runs and bowled 3 wicketless overs.

References

External links
Christopher Sharp at Cricinfo
Christopher Sharp at CricketArchive

1964 births
Living people
People from Orsett
Sportspeople from Essex
English cricketers
Essex Cricket Board cricketers